Zane Jākobsone is a Latvian basketball player. She plays for TTT Riga and Latvia women's national basketball team. She has represented national team in EuroBasket Women 2011.

References

External links 
 FIBA Europe profile
 Uhcougars

Living people
Latvian women's basketball players
Basketball players from Riga
1985 births
Houston Cougars women's basketball players
Small forwards